Okoye is a family name (surname) originating in Nigeria. It is an Anambra dialect derived from the central Igbo name Okorie (meaning someone born on orie market day, or Oye market day as known in Anambra State).

Notable people with the name Okoye include:
 Amobi Okoye, Nigerian-American National Football League defensive tackle for the Chicago Bears
 Gabosky Okoye, popular Nigerian movie producer and pioneer of Nollywood industry
 Christian Okoye, Nigerian-American former National Football League running back for the Kansas City Chiefs
 Ebele Okoye, Nigerian painter
 Godfrey Okoye, Nigerian Catholic bishop
 Kelechi Okoye, Nigerian professional football player
 Lawrence Okoye, British record holder in men's discus and National Football League defensive end for the Miami Dolphins
Nkeiru Okoye (born 1972), African American composer
 Oge Okoye, Nigerian actress
 Peter & Paul Okoye, former members of Nigerian Afro-beats group P-Square
 Sam Okoye, Nigerian former professional football player
 Samuel Okoye, Nigerian astrophysicist
 Stan Okoye, Nigerian-American basketball player
 Ugo Okoye, Nigerian former professional football player

Igbo names